The Stimson Storm is a three-wheeled motor vehicle designed by Barry Stimson, and offered for sale as a kit car. It was introduced into the UK in 2002 and continued in production until 2007, although only one was built during that time.

References

Citations

Bibliography

External links
Stimson Storm in action

Three-wheeled motor vehicles
Cars introduced in 2002